Peter Minshall (born 16 July 1941) is a Trinidadian Carnival artist (described colloquially in Trinidad and Tobago as a "mas-man").

Early life and career beginnings

Minshall was born in Georgetown, Guyana on July 16th, 1941, but moved to Trinidad as a small child after his father took a job as a cartoonist. Growing up in the capital, Port of Spain, Minshall was exposed to Carnival from a young age. He made his first costume at the age of 13. He attended Queen's Royal College, then went on to study Theatre Design at the Central School of Art and Design in London.

Peter Minshall designed Carnival costumes for various relatives and family friends, even before he left school. At art school, he wrote a thesis on the bat (a traditional Carnival character) and his first major theatrical commission, for a production at Sadler's Wells, came after a director saw a portfolio of his Carnival designs.

Rise to fame

When Minshall's mother asked him to create a costume for his adopted sister Sherry-Ann Guy (Coelho) to wear for carnival 1974, it was the pivotal event in Minshall's Carnival career. The costume he created was called "From the Land of the Hummingbird". According to him, it took five weeks, 12 people, 104 feathers, each one made of 150 different pieces of fabric. The costume was designed to allow its wearer total mobility and was an immediate sensation. It also became a major icon of Trinidad Carnival.

The following year, Minshall designed a band for London's Notting Hill Carnival, and in 1976 he was asked by veteran bandleaders Stephen and Elsie Lee Heung to design a full-size band for Trinidad Carnival. Minshall chose the theme Paradise Lost, which was inspired by Milton's epic poem. The band was conceived in four "movements", like a symphony, and introduced a form of winged costume based on Minshall's study of traditional Carnival characters, which he would continue to develop over the course of his career. As Paradise Lost paraded through the streets of the city, a grand narrative unfolded, astounding onlookers. One observer, the photographer Roy Boyke, remarked: "It is doubtful that the work of any single individual has had so searing an impact on the consciousness of an entire country."

Masquerade trilogies and award-winning performances
Paradise Lost was followed by the bands  Zodiac (1978), Carnival of the Sea (1979), Dance Macabre (1980), and Jungle Fever (1981). Papillon (1982), which consisted of 2,500 masqueraders wearing ten-foot butterfly wings in a huge meditation on the ephemeral nature of life, was another Minshall landmark. River (1983) began the trilogy of bands that many consider Minshall's magnum opus. The queen of the band, "Washerwoman", represented life and purity; the king, "Mancrab", was a symbol of greed and technological madness. In Minshall's narrative, these two characters battled over the souls of the River People, portrayed by the band's ordinary masqueraders. On Carnival Monday the River People danced in the streets dressed in white cotton, like a stream of purity, under a rippling white canopy three-quarters of a mile long. On Carnival Tuesday, "Mancrab" triumphed over "Washerwoman"; as her lifeless body was carried away, the River People doused each other with paint of many colours in a ritual of pollution, until the once-pristine masqueraders were a uniform muddy purple. The River trilogy continued in 1984 with Callaloo and concluded in 1985 with The Golden Calabash, in which two full-size bands, Princes of Darkness and Lords of Light, clashed in an epic symbolic battle between good and evil.
A series of pessimistic bands followed in the late 1980s: Rat Race (1987), Jumbie (1988), and Sans Humanité (1989), before Minshall conjured up a dream of joy and harmony in Tantana (1990). The queen and king of the band, "Tan Tan" and "Saga Boy", are among Minshall's most popular creations, giant puppets that danced with lifelike mannerisms in the streets.
Minshall's began his second trilogy in 1995 with a band he called Hallelujah, and continued with Song of the Earth (1996) and Tapestry (1997). The entire cycle was an immense, baroque, overtly theological praise-song, referring to creation myths and religious images.
Depressed by the growing commercialism of Carnival and the decline of the traditions his work had always drawn on, Minshall produced a series of sardonic bands in the late 1990s and early 2000s-- The Lost Tribe (1999), This Is Hell (2001), Ship of Fools (2003)--relieved only by his joyful Picoplat (2002), a band of colourful dancing birds. He produced no bands in 2004 and 2005, but in 2006 Minshall returned to Carnival with The Sacred Heart, an army of "urban samurai cowboys and -girls" marching against hate, selfishness, disease, and prejudice. The band was partly sponsored by the National AIDS Coordinating Committee of Trinidad and Tobago and had an explicit HIV/AIDS awareness message.

Characteristics of Minshall's work

Minshall's costumes have sometimes been called "dancing mobiles." "Mas" as he conceives it is performance art that combines the qualities of sculpture with those of movement. Each costume is designed with the motion of the performer in mind, so that performer and costume are one. "I provide the means for the human body to express its energy," he says. His bands are never merely costumed parades, but exercises in total theatre, using music, drama, dance, and visual spectacle to communicate a metaphor-rich narrative.

His 1987 band Carnival is Colour was a sarcastic response to criticisms that his work was not reflective of Carnival. Another characteristic of Minshall's work is his focus on social or philosophical issues. His work is also controversial at times; his 1995 band Hallelujah resulted in a petition by 208 Pentecostal pastors who deemed the name blasphemous. However, Minshall refused to change the name.

Minshall claims that mas—"living art that we make fresh every year"—is the truest artistic expression of Trinidad. "Our aesthetic is performance, the living now." A major aim of his life's work has been to prove that mas can be "high" art, as capable of the sublime or the universal as any other artform.

Work outside Carnival
In addition to designing mas, Minshall has worked on a variety of performance projects. In 1985, he led Adoration of Hiroshima, a nuclear protest mas', in Washington, D.C. He helped design the opening ceremonies for the 1987 Pan American Games in Indianapolis, the Barcelona 1992 Summer Olympics, the Atlanta 1996 Summer Olympics, the 1994 Football World Cup and the Salt Lake 2002 Winter Olympics. He also collaborated with Jean Michel Jarre, once in 1990 on Paris la Defense, and again in 1995 on the Concert For Tolerance. Minshall's creations have also been on display and took place at the opening ceremony of the ICC Cricket World Cup 2007. He is also credited as the inventor of the Air dancer.

Awards
Guggenheim Fellowship (1982)
Chaconia Silver Medal (1987)
Doctor of Letters, Honoris Causa – from the University of the West Indies (1991)
Prince Claus Award (2001)
Republic Day Award (2005)
Trinity Cross (1996)

Band of the Year titles
Paradise Lost (1976) 
Carnival of the Sea (1979)    
Jungle Fever (1981)
Carnival Is Colour (1987)
Hallelujah (1995)
Song of the Earth (1996)
Tapestry (1997)
The Sacred Heart (2006; medium-size bands category)
Mas Pieta (2020)

References

External links
The Callaloo Company website

Trinidad and Tobago artists
Recipients of the Trinity Cross
Alumni of the Central School of Art and Design
Alumni of Queen's Royal College, Trinidad
Costume designers
People from Georgetown, Guyana
1941 births
Living people